Welbeck Films was a British film production company associated with the Rank Organisation.

Select Films
To Dorothy, A Son (1954)
Desert Mice (1959)
Too Young to Love (1960)
How to Undress in Public without Undue Embarrassment (1965)
Doctor in Trouble (1970)
Percy (1971)
It's a 2'6" Above the Ground World (1973)
Percy's Progress (1974)
Pop Pirates (1984)

References

External links
Welbeck Films at IMDb
Welbeck Films at BFI

Film production companies of the United Kingdom